The Free Egypt Party  is a political party that calls for a civil state and social justice.

References 

Political parties in Egypt
Political parties established in 2011
2011 establishments in Egypt